Martin Rasner (born 18 May 1995) is an Austrian professional footballer who plays as a midfielder for Admira Wacker.

Club career
Rasner joined recently relegated 2. Liga club Admira Wacker on 10 June 2022, signing a two-year contract.

International career
Rasner was a youth international for Austria.

References

1995 births
Living people
Austrian footballers
Austrian expatriate footballers
Austria youth international footballers
Austrian Football Bundesliga players
2. Bundesliga players
FC Liefering players
SV Grödig players
1. FC Heidenheim players
SKN St. Pölten players
Floridsdorfer AC players
FC Admira Wacker Mödling players
Association football midfielders
Austrian expatriate sportspeople in Germany
Expatriate footballers in Germany